The RPG-26 Aglen is a disposable anti-tank rocket launcher developed by the Soviet Union. It fires a single-stage rocket with jack-knife fins, which unfold after launch. The similar sized rocket features a slightly heavier and more powerful HEAT warhead and more powerful rocket engine. The limited extension of the RPG-22 launch tube was found of little use. Therefore the RPG-26 has a rigid non-telescoping launch tube.

Variants 

RShG-2

The RShG-2 (Russian: , Reaktivnaya Shturmovaya Granata, Rocket-propelled Assault Grenade ) Aglen-2 (Аглень-2) is a RPG-26 variant with thermobaric warhead. It is intended to be used against infantry and structures rather than armoured vehicles. 

The solid rocket booster of the warhead in question was taken from the RPG-26 and the fuse taken from the TBG-7 warhead used by the RPG-7.

Operators

Current operators
 
 
 
  - RShG-2 variant
  - domestic variant PDM-1
  - 3,000 in possession
 
 : Liwa al-Quds
 
 
  - RShG-2 variant

Former operators

References

Further reading

Bazalt products
Cold War anti-tank rockets of the Soviet Union
Military equipment introduced in the 1980s
Modern anti-tank rockets of Russia
Modern thermobaric weapons of Russia
Weapons of Russia